Barry Philbin (14 July 1950) is an English former professional rugby league footballer who played in the 1970s. He subsequently broke his leg, which he puts down to playing in jersey number unlucky 13.

Playing career

International honours
Barry Philbin won a cap for England while at Warrington in the 1975 Rugby League World Cup against France.

Championship final appearances
Barry Philbin played, and was man of the match winning the Harry Sunderland Trophy in Warrington's 13-12 victory over St. Helens in the Championship Final (a one-off precursor Premiership) during the 1973–74 season at Central Park, Wigan on Saturday 18 May 1974.

Challenge Cup Final appearances
Barry Philbin played  in Warrington's 24-9 victory over Featherstone Rovers in the 1974 Challenge Cup Final during the 1973–74 season at Wembley Stadium, London on Saturday 11 May 1974, in front of a crowd of 77,400, and played  in the 7-14 defeat by Widnes in the 1975 Challenge Cup Final during the 1974–75 season at Wembley Stadium, London on Saturday 10 May 1975, in front of a crowd of 85,998.

BBC2 Floodlit Trophy Final appearances
Barry Philbin played  in Warrington's 0-0 draw with Salford in the 1974 BBC2 Floodlit Trophy Final during the 1974–75 season at The Willows, Salford on Tuesday 17 December 1974, and played  in the 5-10 defeat by Salford in the 1974 BBC2 Floodlit Trophy Final replay during the 1974–75 season at Wilderspool Stadium, Warrington on Tuesday 28 January 1975.

Player's No.6 Trophy Final appearances
Barry Philbin played  in Warrington's 27-16 victory over Rochdale Hornets in the 1973–74 Player's No.6 Trophy Final during the 1973–74 season at Central Park, Wigan on Saturday 9 February 1974, and played right-, i.e. number 12, in the 9-4 victory over Widnes in the 1977–78 Players No.6 Trophy Final during the 1977–78 season at Knowsley Road, St. Helens on Saturday 28 January 1978.

Club career
Barry Philbin made his début for Warrington on Sunday 3 February 1974, and he played his last match for Warrington on Wednesday 12 April 1978.

Genealogical information
Barry Philbin is the younger brother of the rugby league  for Swinton and Warrington, Mike Philbin. Barry Philbin is married to Julie with two daughters Anna and Gemma.

References

External links
Warrington World Cup Heroes - Barry Philbin
Statistics at wolvesplayers.thisiswarrington.co.uk

1950 births
Living people
England national rugby league team players
English rugby league players
Lancashire rugby league team players
Rugby league locks
Rugby league players from St Helens, Merseyside
Salford Red Devils players
Swinton Lions players
Warrington Wolves players